Pack Up the Cats is the third studio album by the American alternative rock band Local H. Self-described by the band as "our little concept record about a shitty mid-level band", it was released on September 1, 1998, on Island Records, around the time when PolyGram, the parent label of Island, merged with Universal, causing the album to be all but forgotten during the transition. This would be their last album released on Island before they split from the label, as well as the last album with original drummer Joe Daniels. It was ranked #20 on Spin's list of the 20 best albums of 1998, #17 on Robert Christgau's 1998 Dean's List, and #2 on Greg Kot's list of the best albums of 1998.

Track listing

Bonus disc
 "It's a Long Way to the Top (If You Wanna Rock 'n' Roll)" (AC/DC cover) - 4:52
 "Answering Machine" - 7:41

Personnel
Local H
Scott Lucas – vocals, guitar, bass
Joe Daniels – drums, whistling

Guest musicians
Dean DeLeo – guitar on "Cool Magnet"
Brendan O'Brien - hurdy-gurdy on "It's a Long Way to the Top"

Production
Roy Thomas Baker – producer, mixing
Nick DiDia – engineer, mixing
Lisa Ellis – assistant
George Marino – mastering
Eric Hoffman – assistant
Ryan Williams – engineer
Kevin Allison – assistant

Chart positions

References 

1998 albums
Island Records albums
Local H albums
Albums produced by Roy Thomas Baker
Concept albums